Mohamadou Abdouraman (born 24 January 1985) is a Cameroonian footballer who plays as a midfielder for Ágasegyháza.

Career
Abdouraman made his debut for Diósgyőr on 4 September 2010 in a 1–0 win over Vecsési FC in the Nemzeti Bajnokság II. In 2014, he left the club and joined Nyíregyháza Spartacus.

After leaving Nyíregyháza in 2018, Abdouraman played lower-league football for Hírös-Ép and Ágasegyháza, joining the latter in 2021.

Honours
Bylis
 Kategoria e Parë: 2009–10

Diósgyőr
 Hungarian League Cup: 2013–14

References

External links

1985 births
Living people
Footballers from Yaoundé
Cameroonian Muslims
Cameroonian footballers
Association football midfielders
Tonnerre Yaoundé players
FK Renova players
KS Shkumbini Peqin players
KF Bylis Ballsh players
KS Gramozi Ersekë players
Bőcs KSC footballers
Diósgyőri VTK players
Nyíregyháza Spartacus FC players
Nemzeti Bajnokság I players
Cameroonian expatriate footballers
Expatriate footballers in North Macedonia
Expatriate footballers in Albania
Expatriate footballers in Hungary
Cameroonian expatriate sportspeople in North Macedonia
Cameroonian expatriate sportspeople in Albania
Cameroonian expatriate sportspeople in Hungary